"It Blows My Mind" is a song by American rapper Snoop Dogg, featuring guest vocals from American singer Pharrell Williams, taken from The Neptunes's first compilation album Clones. The song was written by Snoop Dogg, Chad Hugo and Pharrell, with production handled by The Neptunes.

Track listing
CD single
 "It Blows My Mind" (feat. Doc Sun) (featuring Pharrell Williams) — 4:25
 "It Blows My Mind" (Original Version) (featuring Pharrell Williams) — 5:04
 "Vote For Snoop" (with Marvin Gaye) — 2:44

Charts

Weekly charts

References

2003 singles
Snoop Dogg songs
Pharrell Williams songs
Song recordings produced by the Neptunes
Songs written by Pharrell Williams
Songs written by Snoop Dogg
Songs written by Chad Hugo
2003 songs
Arista Records singles
Star Trak Entertainment singles